Illusory Walls is the fourth studio album by American emo band the World Is a Beautiful Place & I Am No Longer Afraid to Die, released October 8, 2021, by Epitaph Records. The name of the album, as well as the lead single "Invading the World of the Guilty as a Spirit of Vengeance", is inspired by the video game series Dark Souls. It is the band's first album since the departure of guitarist-vocalists Tyler Bussey and Dylan Balliett and the death of founding member Tom Diaz. The album was followed by a tour through the fall, including a concert at Brooklyn's Elsewhere Hall which was recorded for their live album Thank You for Being Here.

Writing and recording 
Recording was split between Chris Teti's home studio, Silver Bullet Studios, in Burlington, Connecticut; and David Bello's and Katie Dvorak's homes both in Philadelphia, where they recorded their respective vocal parts and Dvorak recorded her synthesizer. This, as well as the year-long timeframe the album was made in, enabled the band to experiment a lot more with their writing, as opposed to past releases which were usually fully turned around in the span of a couple months with ideas needing to be immediate in order to meet strict deadlines. In an interview with BrooklynVegans Andrew Sacher, Chris Teti described this using the example of his process of coming up with his lead guitar part for the middle and three-quarters sections of "Queen Sophie for President", saying that he was "pretty stumped on that song in general for like months" but "sat on it for a couple months and played around with some ideas in my free time", even declaring he would avoid listening to the song for a week before returning to it. One day, while watching a band documentary on either Blur or Bloc Party, Teti was inspired to buy a guitar pedal which led him to the song's dual lead guitar part for that section and even inspired him to rewrite the rest of the song's guitars.

Teti also explained how the length of the two last songs on the album was partly inspired by a conversation with Fiddlehead's Patrick Flynn during the recording of their album Between the Richness; how recording had to be delayed because of Dvorak injuring her vocal chords and being unable to sing for multiple months; and how that injury was one of numerous lyrical themes she and Bello explored on the album along with Bello discussing "dietal issues" and "fucked up stuff" from his childhood growing up in West Virginia, which Teti described as making him "nostalgic for [Bello's] childhood" despite having no nostalgia for his own.

Release 
The album was preceded by three singles: "Invading the World of the Guilty as a Spirit of Vengeance" was released on August 3, 2021, "Queen Sophie for President" was released on September 1, and "Trouble" was released on October 5. The first two came with music videos directed by Adam Peditto, with the former starring Wataru Nishida, and the third had an animated video directed by Callum Scott-Dyson.

Live 

Prior to announcing the album, the band announced US headlining tour dates in June 2021, supported by Bent Knee, Greet Death, State Faults, and Gates. The last of those dates was a November 13 performance at Elsewhere Hall in Brooklyn, featuring the band's core lineup playing alongside Bent Knee's Chris Baum on violin and the band's manager Anthony Gesa on guitar, a show which BrooklynVegans Andrew Sacher reviewed positively. On August 30, 2022, the band announced a live album and tour documentary which had been recorded during the Elsewhere Hall show, both titled Thank You for Being Here. A trailer and a single release of their live performance of "January 10, 2014" from their previous album Harmlessness were both released the same day. The second single, their recording of Illusory Wallss "Afraid to Die", was released September 27, and the album and tour doc both released October 7 by Epitaph Records.

Style 
Per Mxdwn.coms Ani Khajadourian, the album involves "dreamy harmonized moments mixed with intricate sweeping guitar riffs", "lush moments of fast movements and relentless percussion", and gain effect "turn[ed] up ... to 11, bringing their most hard-hitting like fans have never heard before." Opening track "Afraid to Die" "calms the ears" at first, "then rushes in demanding attention", with a "very dreamy and aerial electric guitar" which "plucks away with a flowing melody that all seems to harmonize with itself", then a sudden stop before the song "surges back in with a powerful force that knocks the mind out of the dream state it was in at the beginning." Lead single "Invading the World of the Guilty as a Spirit of Vengeance" is a "relentless song that pounds and drives from start to finish", with an "electric guitar diving into finger tangling riffs" and "percussion pulsing and driving the track". Second single "Queen Sophie for President", is "the perfect mix of both heavier emo-indie rock and radio-ready pop" with "the mixture of the sweetness within [Katie] Dvorak's vocals, and the gritty heaviness of the instruments around her" "stand[ing] as the perfect juxtaposition to each other." Closing track "Fewer Afraid" "once again start[s] with a dreaminess" comparable to "Afraid to Die", "though it plays with a more spatial quality that resembles floating in space." The longest on the record, coming in at just under 20 minutes, "it begins with a beautiful spoken word poem" by frequent collaborator Christopher Zizzamia "recited over a welcoming, growing synth drone and the jingle and chiming of bells", then transitions "into a stunning musical performance incorporating orchestral instruments with the thrashing drums and hair metal guitar riff."

The album contains multiple callbacks to past the World Is music, such as the inclusion of the coda from their debut album's song "Getting Sodas" and a guitar from the band's split album with Deer Leap, Are Here to Help You, appearing simultaneously at the end of "Fewer Afraid"; a small clip of music originally from between the last two songs on Harmlessness appearing at the end of the music video for "Invading the World of the Guilty as a Spirit of Vengeance"; and a reference to the vocals of the Long Live Happy Birthday EP track "Katamari Duquette" on "Died in the Prison of the Holy Office".

Reception 

 Beats Per Minutes Rob Hakimian said that 20-minute closing track "Fewer Afraid" is "a perfect way to underline an album so overloaded with emotion and sheer sonic weight that you sometimes wonder how they manage to keep it chugging so frictionlessly", and "Illusory Walls is a definitive document of the power of their combined ability and belief." In Exclaim!, Adam Feibel called Illusory Walls "a going-for-it album from a band that has never been known to hold back anyway" on which the band "give a lot and only ask for some of your time, patience and attention in return", and that "at every interval, [the band] make it worth your while."

Pitchforks Patric Fallon said the album "sacrifices intimacy and warmth in favor of the most technically proficient and hard-hitting music of their career." Jordan Walsh wrote in Slant that the album "feels like the awakening that the band has been building toward all along", the band "bring[s] their emo-inflected brand of post-rock to bigger, darker, and more life-affirming places than ever before", and that they "[incorporate] a prog-rock bombast and studio slickness that serve to revitalize the band's signature sound." Stereogums Chris DeVille called the album's lyrics "consistently remarkable" and "as immersive and stirring as the music", and the album the band's "heaviest, proggiest, most audacious release to date", "scaling up the old bombast in every conceivable way."

Year-end lists

Track listing

Personnel

Band 
 David F. Bello – vocals, guitar
 Steven K. Buttery – drums, mallets, auxiliary percussion
 Joshua K. Cyr – bass, vocals
 Katie Dvorak – vocals, synthesizer
 Chris Teti – guitar, vocals, bass

Additional musicians 
 Chris Baum, Michael Hustedde, Cymrie Hukill, and Julie Beistline – violin
 Roselie Samte and Caryn Bradley – viola
 Ben Swartz and Lisa Williams – cello
 Matt Hull – trumpet
 Eric Stilwell – trombone
 Travis Bliss – saxophone
 Sarah Cowell, Adam Peditto, Connor Feimster, Christopher June Zizzamia, and Caroline Mills – additional vocals

Technical 
 Chris Teti – producer, mixing engineer, programming, recording engineer
 Greg Thomas – producer, mixing engineer, recording engineer, string composition, string arrangement, additional programming
 Kris Crummett – mastering engineer
 Randy Slaugh – string arrangement, additional programming, additional orchestra production and engineering
 Jamie Van Dyck – string arrangement, additional programming
 Chris Baum – additional string composition (4), string arrangement
 David F. Bello and Katie Dvorak – additional engineering
 Justin Khan and Dennis Tuohey – additional editing
 Brookesia Studio – artwork
 Finnbogi Örn – album layout design

References 

2021 albums
The World Is a Beautiful Place & I Am No Longer Afraid to Die albums
Epitaph Records albums
Post-rock albums by American artists
Progressive rock albums by American artists